The Skardu Valley is located in Gilgit-Baltistan, Pakistan. The valley is about 10 km wide and 40 km long.  It is at the confluence of the Shigar  River and Indus River. It surrounded by the large Karakoram Range and Himalayas.  With the nearby lakes and mountains, it is an important tourist location in Pakistan.
Skardu is the main town of Baltistan along the wide bank of the river Indus. Skardu is the largest district of the Northern Areas. Baltistan is home to some of the highest peaks in the world, the Karakoram Range, Skardu is very popular with Mountaineering Expeditions. It is equally popular with high altitude trekkers, who treks to Baltoro Glacier, K2 Base Camp and Concordia.  Skardu by road, lies approximately 5 hours away from Gilgit and 10 hours drive from Besham.

See also
Skardu District
Skardu Town

References

Valleys of Gilgit-Baltistan